Shock'n Y'all is the eighth studio album by American country music artist Toby Keith. It was released on November 4, 2003 by DreamWorks Records. The album features 10 studio tracks and the 2 live "Bus Songs". The album has been certified 4× Platinum in the U.S. for shipments in excess of 4 million units.

"I Love This Bar", "American Soldier" and "Whiskey Girl" were the three tracks from the album to be released as singles, and all reached Number One on the Hot Country Songs charts. "I Love This Bar" has inspired a chain of restaurants that Keith has launched under the name Toby Keith's I Love This Bar & Grill.

Keith wrote or co-wrote 11 of the 12 songs with his frequent collaborator Scotty Emerick, who also sings backup vocals on the live tracks.

Track listing

Notes
 ALive tracks.

Personnel
Adapted from liner notes.

Mike Brignardello - bass guitar on "Baddest Boots"
Mark Casstevens - acoustic guitar on "Baddest Boots"
Scotty Emerick - acoustic guitar
Shannon Forrest - drums
Paul Franklin - steel guitar
Kenny Greenberg - electric guitar on "Baddest Boots"
Wes Hightower - background vocals
Clayton Ivey - keyboards, piano
Toby Keith - lead vocals
Julian King - percussion, trumpet, background vocals
Jerry McPherson - electric guitar
Phil Madeira - Dobro on "If I Was Jesus"
Brent Mason - electric guitar
Steve Nathan - keyboards, piano
John Wesley Ryles - background vocals
James Stroud - percussion, background vocals
Biff Watson - acoustic guitar
Glenn Worf - bass guitar

Charts

Weekly charts

Year-end charts

References

External links
 

2003 albums
Toby Keith albums
DreamWorks Records albums
Albums produced by James Stroud
Albums produced by Toby Keith